Emmanuel Morin (born 13 March 1995) is a French cyclist, who currently rides for UCI Continental Team . In October 2020, he was named in the startlist for the 2020 Vuelta a España.

Major results
2020
 3rd Overall La Tropicale Amissa Bongo
2021 
 2nd Route Adélie
2022
 2nd Cholet-Pays de la Loire
 6th Route Adélie
 10th La Roue Tourangelle
2023
 9th Classic Loire Atlantique

Grand Tour general classification results timeline

References

External links

1995 births
Living people
French male cyclists
Cyclists from Loire-Atlantique